The European U23 Judo Championships are annual judo competitions organized by the European Judo Union for European judoka aged 23 and younger.

The last contest took place in Sarajevo, Bosnia and Herzegovina. The next contest will be held in Potsdam, Germany.

Competitions

Team competitions

See also
 European Judo Championships
 European Junior Judo Championships
 European Cadet Judo Championships

Notes

References

 
U23
Judo, U23
U23
European Championships, U23
Judo, European Championships U23